André Johan Joubert (born 15 April 1964 in Ladysmith) is a former South African rugby union player, widely known as "The Rolls-Royce of Fullbacks" for his pace, class, and seemingly effortless style. He was capped 34 times at fullback for the Springboks in the 1990s, and amassed 115 test points from 10 tries, 17 penalties and 7 conversions.

1995 Rugby World Cup 

Joubert played a major role in the Springboks' success at the 1995 Rugby World Cup held in South Africa, most notably turning in an outstanding performance in the 15-12 win over the All Blacks in the final, despite playing with a broken hand. The quarterfinal almost proved to be the end of Joubert's World Cup when his hand was broken in contact with Western Samoa player George Harder. That same night he went for surgery and spent time in a decompression chamber.

Domestic career 

Joubert was first choice fullback for the  during the inaugural Super 12 competition in 1996, helping them reach the final against the Auckland Blues. Also, in 1996, he was man of the match against the then , in the Currie Cup final as he scored two tries. Joubert won three Currie Cups: '92, '95 & '96.

He played his last competitive rugby match in the 1999 Currie Cup Final for the  against the Gauteng Lions, a match which also saw the final appearances of Gary Teichmann and Ian McIntosh as captain and coach respectively. It was a sad farewell for three of Natal's favourite sons as the Lions lifted the cup with a convincing 32–9 victory.

International career

He made his international debut, aged 25, in 1989 against a World XV in a game the Springboks won 20–19. His final international appearance came in 1997, in a 61–22 demolition of Australia, the Wallabies in Pretoria.

Test history 
 World Cup Final

Legend: pen = penalty (3 pts.); con = conversion (2 pts.), drop = drop kick (3 pts.).

Other accomplishments 

He was twice (1991 and 1994) shortlisted for the South African "Player of the Year" award, eventually winning in 1996. In 1988, he was one of the five SA Young Players of the Year, along with Kobus Burger, Jacques du Plessis, Christian Stewart and JJ van der Walt.

Apart from playing for the Springboks and Sharks he has also played for the following teams:

South African Barbarians (1992)
British Barbarians (1992)
French Barbarians
World XV (1992)
South African Sevens 1992–1994

See also
List of South Africa national rugby union players – Springbok no. 557

References

External links

South African rugby union players
South Africa international rugby union players
1964 births
Living people
Barbarian F.C. players
People from Ladysmith, KwaZulu-Natal
University of the Free State alumni
Sharks (Currie Cup) players
Sharks (rugby union) players
Free State Cheetahs players
South Africa international rugby sevens players
South African people of French descent
White South African people
Rugby union players from KwaZulu-Natal
Rugby union fullbacks